The British Museum Act 1807 (47 Geo 3 sess 2 c 36) was an Act of the Parliament of the United Kingdom.

The whole Act was repealed by section 13(5) of, and Schedule 4 to, the British Museum Act 1963.

See also
British Museum Act

References
Halsbury's Statutes,

United Kingdom Acts of Parliament 1807
British Museum Acts
1807 in London